Ante Serdarušić (born 24 January 1983 in Tomislavgrad) is a Croatian retired footballer. He last played for Premijer Liga club Posušje.

Club career 
Serdarušić began his career with HNK Hajduk Split. In summer 2002,he joined HNK Trogir. After four years here, he signed with NK Posušje. In June 2008, he came to Zrinjski from NK Posušje and had a trial with Fortuna Düsseldorf on 1 July 2009. On 23 July 2009, he signed for SpVgg Greuther Fürth. After half a year at Fürth, Serdarušić had only played one fixture. As a result of his poor performance, his contract was dissolved on 22 December 2009. In May 2010, he signed with NK Široki Brijeg.

In January 2020, Serdarušić returned to his former club HŠK Posušje.

References

External links

1983 births
Living people
People from Tomislavgrad
Croats of Bosnia and Herzegovina
Association football midfielders
Bosnia and Herzegovina footballers
Croatian footballers
HŠK Posušje players
HŠK Zrinjski Mostar players
SpVgg Greuther Fürth players
NK Široki Brijeg players
NK Imotski players
NK Croatia Zmijavci players
First League of the Federation of Bosnia and Herzegovina players
Premier League of Bosnia and Herzegovina players
2. Bundesliga players
First Football League (Croatia) players
Croatian expatriate footballers
Expatriate footballers in Germany
Croatian expatriate sportspeople in Germany